Mathkur is a village in India located near Bangalore North. It is part of the Shivakote Grama panchayat. Mathkur has a total population of 1,065, most of whom are farmers. The lake in this village is about 67 acres. 

The village is close to the Indian Institute of Horticultural Research (IIHR) and also to an Indian Centre for Theoretical Research (ICTS) which is located near Kalenahalli.

The neighboring villages of mathkur include Linganahalli, Kalenahalli, Ivarakandapura, seethakempanahall and Kakol.

Places of Worship

1) Veerabhadraswamy temple.
2) Lord Shiva temple.
3) Venkataramana swamy temple.
4) Anjaneya swamy temple.
5) Poojamma Temple.

Educational institutions

 Government Primary school

Transport

266A from Mathkur to Market,
266J from Mathkur to Majestic,
285DA from Majestic to Hessaraghatta via Mathkur,
253LA from DODDABALLAPUR to Hessaraghatta via Mathkur,
251G from Mathkur to Majestic,
407 , 266 busses can also be used but have to walk for 1.5 KM to reach Mathkur,

Villages in Bangalore Urban district